Luis Comitante (born 16 June 1912, date of death unknown) was a Uruguayan-Brazilian football player and manager. Teams that he has managed include ABC in Brazil and the El Salvador national team. Comitante is deceased.

References

External links
http://www.bauvelho.com.br/?p=497
http://cev.org.br/comunidade/futebol/debate/futebol-maranhense-e-barriga-zeca-soares/
http://m.ceroacero.es/manager.php?id=6963

1912 births
Year of death missing
El Salvador national football team managers
Uruguayan football managers